The Amphibious Corps (Amf) is the maritime land force arm of the Swedish Navy, with an emphasis on coastal defence. Until 2000 it was known as the Coastal Artillery, but the name was changed to reflect its different role in a post-Cold War world, where its amphibious special operations arm, Kustjägarna, has grown in significance while its coastal batteries have been decommissioned.

Organization
The 1st Marine Regiment (Amf 1) is the main combat unit of the Amphibious Corps. With its anti-ship missiles, controllable mines and coastal rangers, as well as marine infantry units, it can exercise control in littoral areas. The Regiment is primarily based at Berga Naval Base near Stockholm. Also based in Gothenburg, is the Marine component of the 13th Security Battalion. In addition, the 1st Marine Regiment is also responsible for training three Home Guard battalions, one of whom is based on Gotland. These are the:
1st Marine Regiment (Amf 1)
2nd Amphibious Battalion
 HQ Company
 202nd Coastal Ranger Company
 204th Rifle Company
 205th Rifle Company
 206th Rifle Company
 Support Company
VBSS troop
28th Home Guards Battalion Roslagen
29th Home Guards Battalion Södertörn
4th Marine Regiment (Amf 4)
5th Amphibious Battalion
17th Amphibious Patrol Boat Company - the company also has anti-submarine warfare capable units based in Gothenburg.
132nd Naval Security Company

Ranks and insignia

Since 2019 the ranks and insignia of the Swedish Amphibious Corps are as follows:

Officers

Other ranks

Heraldry and traditions
The coat of arms of the Swedish Amphibious Corps since 2000. It was previously used by the Swedish Coastal Artillery 1979–2000 and the Coastal Artillery Center (Kustartillericentrum, KAC) 1995–1997. Blazon: "Gules, two gunbarrels of older pattern in saltire above a flaming grenade and waves, all or".

See also 
  - United States Marine Corps
  – Nyland Brigade
  – Royal Marines
  – Netherlands Marine Corps
  – Sea Battalion
  – San Marco Marine Brigade
  – Portuguese Marine Corps
  – Spanish Marine Infantry

References

Notes

Print

External links

 
 

 
2000 establishments in Sweden
Military units and formations established in 2000
Marines